Neocoenorrhinus is a genus of beetles belonging to the family Attelabidae.

The species of this genus are found in Europe and Japan.

Species:
 Neocoenorrhinus abeillei Loges, 1869 
 Neocoenorrhinus cuprinus'' Alonso-Zarazaga

References

Attelabidae